Emilio Sánchez (born 1965) is a Spanish tennis player.

Emilio Sánchez may also refer to:
Emilio Sánchez Perrier (1855–1907), Spanish painter
Emilio Sanchez (artist) (1921–1999), Cuban artist
Emilio Sánchez (footballer) (born 1985), Spanish footballer
Alfonso Emilio Sánchez
Emilio Sanchez, character in Inheritance (2020 film)